Jānis Backāns (23 June 1925 – 2004) was a Latvian and Latgalian ceramicist.

Biography
Jānis Backāns was born at Ezergailīši village in Feimaņi Parish, Latvia in 1925. His grandfather Jāzeps taught him the ceramicist craft in his early days and later he was a pupil in the workshop of the famous Latgalian ceramicist Andrejs Paulāns.

In 1942, Backāns became a ceramicist. From 1942 to 1962, he worked in Krustpils production plant. Since 1957, his works were exhibited in exhibitions. His works were selected for several exhibitions in Latgale and outside the Latvian SSR, in France, Hungary, Romania, Bulgaria and Czechoslovakia.

References

External links 

 Works by Backāns @ Latgale Culture History Museum

1925 births
2004 deaths
20th-century Latgalian ceramists
20th-century Latvian ceramists
20th-century Latvian male artists
21st-century Latvian male artists